Pruflas: Book of Angels Volume 18 is an album by clarinetist David Krakauer performing compositions from John Zorn's second Masada book, "The Book of Angels".

Reception

Denti Alligator stated "Krakauer is of course a veteran klezmer musician who has led and contributed to an impressive array of recordings in both more traditional settings and various crossover projects. In this group he succeeds in melding klezmer with a little funk, some rock, and a tad bit of electronic music. The result is, mostly, exhilarating".

Track listing 
All compositions by John Zorn
 "Ebuhuel" - 3:51   
 "Kasbeel" - 4:17   
 "Vual" - 4:58   
 "Parzial-Oranir" - 11:10   
 "Egion" - 5:43   
 "Neriah-Mahariel" - 7:03   
 "Tandal" - 3:35   
 "Monadel" - 5:51

Personnel 
David Krakauer - clarinet, bass clarinet 
Sheryl Bailey - guitar 
Jerome Harris - electric bass, voice 
Keepalive - laptop 
Michael Sarin - drums

References 

2012 albums
Albums produced by John Zorn
Tzadik Records albums
Book of Angels albums